Eric DeLamarter (February 18, 1880 in Lansing, Michigan – May 17, 1953 in Orlando, Florida) was an American composer and classical organist. 

He was the child of Dr. Louis and Mary B. DeLamarter, and went to Albion College.

He served as assistant conductor of the Chicago Symphony Orchestra from 1918 to 1933 and from 1933 to 1936 he served as their associate conductor.   He was also an uncredited orchestra conductor in the 1946 film "Humoresque".

Among his pupils was Leon Stein.

Eric DeLamarter was a composer, church organist and music critic of "Interocean."  He was also a close friend and adviser to Leo Sowerby as well as a champion of Sowerby's music.  DeLamarter aided Sowerby in his becoming an accomplished organist.  In 1915 he was organist at the Fourth Presbyterian Church in Chicago, IL.  The following year he commissioned and gave the premiere performance of Sowerby's Comes Autumn Time.

The Lila Acheson Wallace Library of The Juilliard School has several of his holographs as well as printed items.  The University of Michigan Library holds the holograph of his organ concerto and a number of printed items.

References

External links
Eric De Lamarter Papers at The Newberry

1880 births
1953 deaths
American classical composers
American male classical composers
20th-century classical composers
20th-century American composers
20th-century American male musicians
Musicians from Lansing, Michigan
Classical musicians from Michigan
Musicians from Chicago
Classical musicians from Illinois
American classical organists
20th-century organists
American male conductors (music)
20th-century American conductors (music)
Albion College alumni